The udvornici, also udvarniks or royal serving people (Slovak: dvorníci), was a class of half-free people who were obliged to provide well-specified services to the royal court in the medieval Kingdom of Hungary. They seem to have been descended from the Slavic population which was subjugated during the Hungarian conquest of the Carpathian Basin. Word udvornici is derived from slavic "U dvora", meaning "at/near the (royal) court". Their lord was the monarch, but they were administered by the Palatine.

References

Sources

Medieval Kingdom of Hungary